Carlos Eduardo Bendini Giusti (born 27 April 1993), simply known as Eduardo (エドゥ) or formerly Dudu is a Brazilian professional footballer who plays for Yokohama F. Marinos as a centre back in J1 League.

Club career
Dudu kicked off his career with Metropolitano in 2011. In 2012, he was loaned out to Austrian club FC Lustenau 07. During the loan spell, he played 12 matches and scored 2 goals. After the stint, he was loaned to archrivals Austria Lustenau. In July 2013, he joined Gainare Tottori of J2 League again on loan.

In 2014, Eduardo again joined a Japanese side on loan, this time with Tochigi. After the spell ended, on the deadline day of the summer transfer window, he was signed by J1 League side Kashiwa Reysol on loan.

Club statistics
Updated to 5 November 2022.

1Includes J. League Championship.

Honours

Club
Kawasaki Frontale
J1 League: 2017, 2018

Yokohama F. Marinos
J1 League: 2022

References

External links
 

 Profile at Kawasaki Frontale

1993 births
Living people
Association football midfielders
Brazilian footballers
Brazilian expatriate footballers
Clube Atlético Metropolitano players
FC Lustenau players
SC Austria Lustenau players
Gainare Tottori players
Tochigi SC players
Kashiwa Reysol players
Kawasaki Frontale players
Matsumoto Yamaga FC players
Sagan Tosu players
Yokohama F. Marinos players
J1 League players
J2 League players
Campeonato Brasileiro Série D players
Brazilian expatriate sportspeople in Austria
Brazilian expatriate sportspeople in Japan
Expatriate footballers in Austria
Expatriate footballers in Japan
Association football defenders
Footballers from São Paulo